ZGRF1 is a protein in humans that is encoded by the ZGRF1 gene that has a weight of 236.6 kDa. The ZGRF1 gene product localizes to the cell nucleus and promotes DNA repair by stimulating homologous recombination. This gene shows relatively low expression in most human tissues, with increased expression in situations of chemical dependence. ZGRF1 is orthologous to nearly all kingdoms of Eukarya. Functional domains of this protein link it to a series of helicases, most notably the AAA_12 and AAA_11 domains.

Gene 
The entire gene is 97,663 base pairs long and has an unprocessed mRNA that is 6,740 nucleotides in length. It consists of 28 exons that encode for a 2104 amino acid protein. 12 splice variants exist for C4orf21.

Locus 
ZGRF1 is located on the fourth chromosome on the 4q25 position near the LARP7 gene. It is encoded for on the minus strand.

Homology and evolution

Homologous domains 
ZGRF1 contains a DUF2439 domain (domain of unknown function), zf-GRF domain, and AAA_11 and an AAA_12 domain (ATPases associated with diverse cellular activities). DUF domains are involved in telomere maintenance and meiotic segregation. AAA_11 and AAA_12 contain a P-loop motif which are involved in conjugative transfer proteins. Other helicase domains are also present in c4orf21 orthologs.

Paralogs 
There are 9 moderately-related proteins in humans that are paralogous to the ATP-dependent helicase containing domains in the C-terminus of c4orf21 after the 1612th amino acid. A majority of these proteins are in the RNA helicase family. There are no known paralogs to the large N-terminal portion of the protein.

Orthologs 
Complete orthologs of the c4orf21 gene are found in mammalia. The helicase domain containing C-terminus portion of the gene is conserved across Eukarya.

Protein

Primary sequence 
ZGRF1 is 236.6 kDa.

Post-translational modifications 
ZGRF1 has experimentally determined phosphorylation sites at the Y38, S137, S140, S325, and S864 positions.

Secondary structure 
A weak transmembrane domain is predicted in the TMHMM server with one loop in the C-terminus of the protein prior to the helicase core. This domain contains both ends outside of a membrane.

Tertiary domains and quaternary structure
ZGRF1 has related structures to Upf1, a paralog. These structures have the capability to bind zinc ions and mRNA.

Function and biochemistry 
ZGRF1 is a 5’-to-3’ DNA helicase that promotes genome stability by stimulating DNA repair by homologous recombination. Specifically, ZGRF1 facilitates repair of replication-blocking DNA lesions induced by agents such as mitomycin C and camptothecin. Mechanistically, ZGRF1 physically interacts with the RAD51 recombinase and stimulates strand exchange by RAD51-RAD54. 

ZGRF1 shares homology in its DUF2439 domain with Saccharomyces cerevisiae Mte1 and Schizosaccharomyces pombe Dbl2, which play similar roles in recombinational DNA repair.

The human paralogs to the helicase core of the ZGRF1 gene are associated with translation, transcription, nonsense-mediated mRNA decay, RNA decay, miRNA processing, RISC assembly, and pre-mRNA splicing. These paralogs operate under a SPF1 RNA helicase motif.

Mov10, a paralog, and probable RNA helicase is required for RNA-mediated gene silencing by the RNA-induced silencing complex (RISC). It is also required for both miRNA-mediated translational repression and miRNA-mediated cleavage of complementary mRNAs by RISC, and for RNA-directed transcription and replication of the human hepatitis delta virus (HDV). Mov10 interacts with small capped HDV RNAs derived from genomic hairpin structures that mark the initiation sites of RNA-dependent HDV RNA transcription.

Expression 
Expression is relatively low for c4orf21 compared to other proteins. Expression of c4orf21 is slightly elevated compared to its average expression in tissue in the hematopoietic and lymphatic systems, and is above average in the brain also. Lower averages exist in liver, pharynx, and skin tissue.

Transcription factor interactions 
The transcriptional start site for ZGRF1 aligns best with ATF, CREB, deltaCREB, E2F, and E2F-1 transcription factor binding sites.

Interacting proteins 
C4orf21 shows predicted protein interaction with its AQR, DNA2, IGHMBP2, LOC91431, and SETX paralogs.

Clinical significance 
Upon examination of variable GEO profiles, there were many related to Hepatitis and other disorders of the liver. The best correlative studies were those in relation to liver transplant failure. ZGRF1 showed significantly increased expression in those who were nicotine dependent versus a control group of non-smokers.

A paralog of ZGRF1 was found to inhibit HIV-1 Replication at multiple stages. Mov10 is involved in the biological processes of RNA-mediated gene silencing, transcription, transcription regulation and has hydrolase and helicase activity through ATP and RNA binding.

References

External links

Further reading